Gusiny Brod is a settlement (a selo) in Novosibirsky District of Novosibirsk Oblast, Russia. It is part of Razdolnensky Selsovet.

History
In 1926, the settlement had 123 households and 605 residents (291 men, 314 women; mostly Zyryans). It was the center of Gusino-Brodsky Selsovet of Kamensky District, Novosibirsky District, Siberian Krai.

Religious buildings
 St. Nicholas Church is a wooden Orthodox church built not earlier than 2005.

References

Rural localities in Novosibirsk Oblast
Novosibirsky District